Simon Sidney Hill (1 October 18293 March 1908) was an English philanthropist, merchant, gentleman farmer, and justice of the peace. From beginnings as a linen merchant, he made his fortune as a colonial and general merchant trading from South Africa. He supported and endowed almshouses in Churchill and Lower Langford, and manses for Methodist clergy at Banwell and Cheddar. He founded Methodist churches at Port Elizabeth, Sandford, Shipham and Blagdon besides the Wesley Methodist church and school at Churchill. Many of his charitable foundations still survive.

Early life

Hill was born on 1October 1829 at Berkeley Place in Clifton, Bristol, and was as baptised at St James' Priory, Bristol, on 1November 1829. He was the sixth and youngest son of Thomas Hill, a former master sweep and soot merchant, and Elizabeth, .

His father was apprenticed as a climbing boy from the age of eight, serving from 1787 to 1798, before joining the Royal Marines at Devonport, Plymouth. He left the navy after four years, returned to sweeping, but left it again to earn a living as a labourer in Devonport Dockyard. He returned to sweeping again in 1811 and followed it until his retirement. He was also a foreman to the Clifton Norwich Union Fire Insurance Office for twelve years, until one of his other sons took over the role. Thomas died on  when Sidney was just  years old. 

Hill was educated at Portway House boarding school, located between Victoria Park and Partis College, in Weston, Bath. In September 1847, Sidney joined Sunday Methodist society classes, led by William Bobbett, at the Old Market Street chapel in Bristol, where he converted to Methodism. Hill would later dedicate Shipham Methodist Chapel to the memory of William.

Life as a merchant

Early years

Described as a delicate boy, Hill did not follow in his father's soot business, although two of his brothers did. When he came of age, he inherited money from his father's estate that he used to open a small linen draper shop at Berkeley Place, Clifton. The business grew and he moved to larger premises at 7 Byron Place, Lower Berkeley Place, Clifton. However, by 1856 he was not in good health and his doctor advised him to travel to a country with a warmer climate. Hill sold the drapery business and embarked on a sea voyage to New Zealand, but when the ship berthed at Algoa Bay in Port Elizabeth, South Africa, he decided to remain there.

In 1857, Hill opened a dry goods store at Port Elizabeth, and in 1859, went into partnership with William Savage. Savage was the son of a former paper maker and stationer in Lewes, East Sussex. He had arrived in Port Elizabeth around 1849 and started a business selling stationery and hardware. Their partnership, Savage & Hill, Colonial and General Merchants, began trading commodities from 95 and 97 Main Street (southern side) in Port Elizabeth. They traded in anything from household hardware, refined sugar, ammunition, minerals, to ostrich feathers for the fashion trade and haberdashery industry. The bulk of their trade was transacted from Port Elizabeth, but as the business prospered, branches were opened in the principal towns of the Cape Colony and in the Colony of Natal.

Marriage

In 1864, Hill returned to London to direct the firm's large shipping interests from their offices at 41 Bow Lane, Cheapside, London, moving later to offices at 6 and 42 Palmerston Buildings in Bishopsgate Street. On 15June 1864, he married Mary Ann Bobbett at the Wesleyan chapel, Churchill, North Somerset.

John Winter Bobbett was a baker and corn and flour dealer, in partnership with his brother, and Hill's close friend, William Bobbett, at W. and J. W. Bobbett, on West Street, Old Market, Bristol. In 1849, Bobbett was sent to school; first to the Quaker Friends' Boarding School at Sidcot, near the village of Winscombe, North Somerset, and then to a finishing school, the Quaker Mount School in York. She was away from home for five years, and when she returned to Bristol, she became a housekeeper for her uncle, William Bobbett, at West Street, Bristol. 

Hill had met her before their marriage, when he had been invited to Sunday tea at Bristol, and then at Sidney Villa in Dinghurst, Churchill, after William Bobbett had moved there in 1859, following his retirement on 2July 1859. Bobbett and Hill shared a staunch belief in the work of the Wesleyan Methodist Church, and this would influence much of their life, particularly Hill's later years after he purchased the Langford estate.

Life in South Africa
The Hills spent six months in London before Sidney's business took them back to South Africa, departing England on 10February 1865 for a month long voyage to Port Elizabeth. Savage & Hill prospered after the growth of trade at Port Elizabeth following the discovery of diamonds at Griqualand West in 1870, and the subsequent completion of the railway to Kimberley, Northern Cape, in 1873. With the rapid expansion of the Cape Colony's railway network to the interior over the following years, the harbour of Port Elizabeth became the focus for serving import and export needs of a large area of the Cape's hinterland. The rapid economic development around the port, which followed the railway construction, caused Port Elizabeth to be nicknamed "the Liverpool of South Africa", after the major British city and port.

Despite being engaged in an expanding business, Hill found time for furthering the work of the Wesleyan Methodist church at Port Elizabeth, occupying the offices of superintendent of the Sunday school, class leader, and chapel and circuit steward. In April 1870, Hill gave £550 towards the construction of the original Wesleyan Methodist chapel at Russell Road, Port Elizabeth.

Death of Mary Ann Hill
Around 1870, Mary Ann Hill was diagnosed with tuberculosis in her left lung. With her health failing, the Hills left South Africa for England on 8April 1874. They decided to winter in Bournemouth due to the mild climate there, but after only five weeks' residence, Mary Ann died in the evening of 7 December 1874. She was buried at Arnos Vale Cemetery in Bristol. In 1881, her remains were removed from Arnos Vale and reinterred at the Wesleyan Methodist church, Churchill, that was built in her memory in 1880.

Later life

Return to England

In mourning after Mary Ann's death, Hill returned to South Africa, but could not settle, and in June 1876, he decided to find somewhere to live near Churchill, close to his friend William Bobbett. In mid1877, Langford House, Lower Langford, came on to the market after the owner, William Turner, a partner in a ship and marine insurance broker company in Bristol, died on 13November 1876. Hill purchased the estate and took up residence at the end of October 1877. The estate included  of parkland,  of orchards,  of arable land, stabling, and two adjacent, semidetached houses in Langford village, known as Mendip Villa and Richmond House.

Hill retired from commercial life after dissolving the Savage & Hill partnership on 1November 1881. By that point, he had accumulated considerable wealth, and consequently, was able to spend a substantial amount of money making improvements to Langford House. He remodelled the house, added a belvedere tower in Italianate style, and decorated the interior in typical Victorian style with dark paint and panelling. In 1891, a clock tower was built above the coach house and a gilt turret clock and carillon installed in November of that year. He installed a conservatory and greenhouses, constructed in teak by Foster and Pearson of Beeston, Nottinghamshire, to provide the bedding and house plants for the estate.

Livestock breeding

Hill took up a new life as a gentleman farmer, adding stables to the estate, a dairy and "Langford Bullock Palaces" for his prized Red Scotch Shorthorn cattle. He was well known as a breeder of pedigree shorthorn cattle, Southdown sheep, hackney, and shire horses. In 1881, he laid the foundation for his herd by purchasing two pedigree Dairy Shorthorns cows, Minerva and Irony, and the pedigree bull Oswald 50118, from Richard Stratton of Duffryn, Newport. However, by 1892 the herd had outgrown their accommodation, and they were sold at auction. Between 1897 and 1898, Hill purchased six cows, that included the pedigree cow Lavender Gem, and her heifer calf Lavender Wreath. The two cows had offspring that were show prize winners. The whole of the herd was of Scottish origin, apart from shorthorns purchased from Joseph Dean Willis of Bapton on 30July 1897. The herd was dispersed shortly after Hill's death, in an auction held at Langford House on 10September 1908.

Work for the Methodist Church

Hill did much to further the work of the Methodist church in Somerset and help those in need. In memory of Mary Ann Hill, he founded the Memorial Wesley Methodist church and schoolroom at Churchill. He also vested in trustees a large sum of money to provide an income for the maintenance of the chapel and schoolroom. In 1887, he founded Victoria Jubilee Homes, and gifted a farm and lands at Congresbury, to provide for repairs and maintenance. From the 1890s, Methodists had come from the North of England to be employed at the paper mills in Redcliffe Street, Cheddar, and from South Wales at the shirt factories located in the Cheddar Gorge. Around the mid1890s, Methodist society leaders at Cheddar, Somerset, began to see the need for larger and more convenient premises. Hill was approached, and two cottages, and the garden and orchard behind the existing chapel, were purchased. A manse to replace the one at Axbridge, two ministers' houses on the Worle Road, Banwell, and a furnished chapel in Cheddar were all gifted by Hill, including the furnishings for a schoolroom that was created by converting the old chapel. He also funded and endowed twelve Wesleyan Cottage Homes at Churchill.

Other charitable acts

Although a lifelong Methodist, Hill helped other Christian institutions such as contributing to Churchill parish church funds, donating £100 to the building of All Saints Church, Sandford, and gifting a stained glass window to Axbridge parish church after its restoration in 1887. Hill would also help people directly: He would notice those needing help and make enquiries about them. A note would be given to them to take to the post office in Churchill. The two upstairs rooms of the office were full of household items provided by Langford House. Arthur Henry Carter, the owner of the post office, would follow the instructions in the note and supply blankets, boots, food or whatever was required. At Christmas, children who attended the Methodist Sunday school were given a set of clothes each and the contents of each parcel were noted so that the same things were not included for the following Christmas. Hill was also a longterm supporter of the Bristol Hospital for Sick Children and Women, and would visit the hospital at Christmas, giving money to each patient and nurse.

Public life
On 11 June 1885, Hill was elected a fellow of the Royal Colonial Institute, and by May 1886, he was a steward of the Infant Orphanage Asylum. He was a Liberal in politics and was selected as a vicepresident of the Wells Liberal Association on 20May 1886. On 19October 1886, he was made a justice of the peace for Somerset and served on the Axbridge bench for over 20 years. From 1887, he served as the vicepresident of the Weston‑super‑Mare and East Somerset horticultural society, and in January of the following year, he accepted the office of president of the society. By January 1890, he had been elected to the Council of the Imperial Federation League. He took lead positions amongst the Wesleyans of the Bristol and Bath district, representing the district at church synods and conferences.

Hill also undertook parish responsibilities such as being president of the Churchill football and cricket clubs. He lent a field free of charge for their use in Langford House grounds and contributed to the finances of each club. He was an organiser for the Jubilee and Coronation celebrations that were hosted in the grounds of Langford House. On 7February 1899, he was elected vicepresident of the Wrington and District Fanciers' Association.

Death and funeral

After returning from church on 26January 1908, at about 4:00pm, Hill slipped while walking across the Langford House hallway, fracturing his thigh. After four weeks, his thigh seemed to be healing, and the splints were removed. However, more serious complications developed; influenza followed by pneumonia, and he died at 11:45am on 3March 1908, aged 78. The funeral was held at the Wesleyan Methodist church, Churchill, on 10March 1908, at 2:00pm.

Despite the cold and windy weather that day, hundreds of people attended from Churchill, Langford, Wrington, and other villages; there were so many mourners that the service had to be held outside the Methodist chapel. The outdoor staff of the Langford House estate, which including nine gardeners, headed the funeral's foot procession. The coffin bore the inscription "Simon Sidney Hill, born 1 October 1829, died 3 March 1908" and he was interred in the same grave as Mary Ann Hill. A memorial service was held at the Methodist chapel, Cheddar, in the evening of 15March 1908, and was conducted by Henry John Stockbridge.

Legacy

Langford House was later left to Hill's nephew Thomas James Hill, but he only lived there for four years before his death on 9February 1912. In 1948, the University of Bristol founded the School of Veterinary Science there. Many of Hill's other charitable works still survive today; Victoria Jubilee Langford Homes and the Sidney Hill Churchill Wesleyan Cottage Homes are registered charities providing housing for local people in need.

Hill's memory lives on in the legacy of buildings that he founded, but he meant more than this to some of his neighbours. The late Ronald Henry Bailey, a former editor of The Weston & Somerset Mercury newspaper, and an authority on Mendip folklore and other antiquarian matters, described Hill as:

Nonetheless, Hill's wealth came from trade with southern Africa and it is not certain to what extent his fortune was amassed at the expense of others. On balance, however, it is thought likely that his business dealings as a merchant were without reproach. Certainly, that whatever his attitudes as a younger man, he later shared his wealth with the less fortunate.

Philanthropic works

Hill was prolific in works for the public benefit. He funded and endowed the Queen Victoria Memorial Homes in Langford, to benefit those who could not afford to rent decent and safe accommodation. He founded Wesleyan churches, Sunday schools, and ministers' houses in England and in South Africa, and endowed a house at Homes for Little Boys, a former orphanage near Swanley, Kent. He also donated substantial amounts of money to aid the Wesleyan cause: £500 to help build the Wesleyan chapel at Linden Road, Clevedon, and after his death, Hill's estate donated £1,500 to fund the building of the Wesleyan Mission Hall at Seymour Road, Gloucester. His final act to benefit the poor was to fund, furnish, and endow twelve Wesleyan cottage homes at Churchill.

Arms
In 1882, arms were granted and confirmed.

See also

Footnotes

References

Further reading

External links

1829 births
1908 deaths
19th-century English businesspeople
English justices of the peace
English merchants
English Methodists
People from Clifton, Bristol
People of the Victorian era
Wesleyan Methodists